Joshua W. Hill (15 April 1773 – 1844?) was an American adventurer.

The descendants of the mutineers had chosen to migrate back to Tahiti following the death of the last mutineer, John Adams, but had recently returned. Hill, taking advantage of the instability, was able to be elected President of the island. He served in that position until 1838. His rule became increasingly tyrannical, and he began imprisoning many of the island's inhabitants. He was deposed and driven off the island in 1838, and the descendants of the original inhabitants took control of the island again.

Hill was probably the basis for the character Butterworth Stavely in Mark Twain's short story The Great Revolution in Pitcairn.

References

Other sources
"Joshua Hill, the Self-Instituted King of Pitcairn: Separating the Truth from the Lies" 2012 lecture by Tillman Nechtman, PhD

Pitcairn Islands politicians
1773 births
1840s deaths
19th-century politicians
19th-century national presidents
American emigrants to the Pitcairn Islands
Heads of state of former countries